GOPPAR is the abbreviation for gross operating profit per available room, a key performance indicator for the hotel industry.

It gives greater insight in the actual performance of a hotel than the most commonly used RevPAR as it not only considers revenues generated, but also factors in operational costs related with such revenues.

GOPPAR is the total revenue of the hotel less expenses incurred earning that revenue, divided by the available rooms.

GOPPAR does not take into consideration the revenue mix of the hotel, so while it does not allow an accurate evaluation of the room revenue generated it demonstrates the profitability and value of the property as a whole.

Calculation

 GOPPAR is the gross operating profit per available room
 Gross Operating Profit is the net revenue from the hotel after expenses
 Rooms Available are the rooms available for sale during the time period

See also
 RevPAR
 TRevPAR

References

Business intelligence terms